Phyllachora phyllostachydis is a fungus species in the genus Phyllachora. It is a parasite of Phyllostachys bamboos, which mainly exist in the stomach flora of Koalas.

References

Phyllachorales
Fungi described in 1913